The Aftershock Tour was a tour performed by the heavy metal band Motörhead in support of their album, Aftershock.

Background 
Motörhead were due to embark on a European tour alongside Saxon, followed by a tour in Germany and Scandinavia due to last until mid December 2013 but the dates were postponed and rescheduled for February and March 2014 due to Lemmy's health problems.

However, in January 2014, Motörhead announced the cancellation of the new February and March dates of their European tour as Lemmy was still to reach full recovery from diabetes related health problems. At the Los Angeles show on April 11, both Slash and Lemmy's son Paul Inder appeared and played some songs. Slash would return again at bands show at Coachella Festival. At Birmingham former members Eddie Clarke and Phil Taylor appeared on stage with Eddie playing "Ace of Spades".

Later their show at Monsters of Rock at São Paulo was cancelled due to stomach problems suffered by Lemmy. Phil Campbell and Mikkey Dee were then joined by Sepultura's Andreas Kisser, Paulo Jr. and Derrick Green for a jam session.

Setlist

First Setlist (Legs 1-2)
 "Damage Case"
 "Stay Clean"
 "Metropolis"
 "Over the Top"
 Guitar Solo
 "The Chase Is Better Than the Catch"
 "Rock It"
 "Lost Woman Blues"
 "Doctor Rock" (with drum solo)
 "Just 'Cos You Got the Power"
 "Going to Brazil"
 "Killed by Death"
 "Ace of Spades"
Encore:
  "Overkill"

Second Setlist
 "Shoot You in the Back"
 "Damage Case"
 "Stay Clean"
 "Metropolis"
 "Over the Top"
 Guitar Solo
 "The Chase Is Better Than the Catch"
 "Rock It"
 "Suicide"
 "Do You Believe"
 "Lost Woman Blues"
 "Doctor Rock" (with drum solo)
 "Just 'Cos You Got the Power"
 "Going to Brazil"
 "Ace of Spades"
Encore:
  "Overkill"

Third Setlist
 "We Are Motörhead"
 "Damage Case"
 "Stay Clean"
 "Metropolis"
 "Over the Top"
 Guitar Solo
 "The Chase Is Better Than the Catch"
 "Rock It"
 "Lost Woman Blues"
 "Doctor Rock" (with drum solo)
 "Orgasmatron" or "Just 'Cos You Got the Power"
 "Going to Brazil"
 "Ace of Spades"
Encore:
 "Overkill"

Other songs played 

 "No Class"
 "Rosalie" (Bob Seger/Thin Lizzy cover)
 "'Heroes'" (David Bowie song) (Was attempted but was scrapped since Lemmy kept forgetting the lyrics)
 "I Know How to Die"

Tour dates

Personnel 
 Lemmy Kilmister – bass guitar, lead vocals
 Phil Campbell – guitar
 Mikkey Dee – drums

References

Motörhead concert tours
2014 concert tours
2015 concert tours